The term oracy was coined by Andrew Wilkinson, a British researcher and educator, in the 1960s. This word is formed by analogy from literacy and numeracy. The purpose is to draw attention to the neglect of oral skills in education.

Concept 
According to Wilkinson's conceptualization, oracy in educational theory is the fluent, confident, and correct use of the standard spoken form of one's native language. It also established a standard where students' abilities are developed within an integrated program of speaking and listening, reading and writing. Recent studies also equate oracy with the notion of "talking to learn" within the perspective that knowledge is constructed by the individual knower, through an interaction between what is already known and new experience. An example of oracy-based education initiative was the UK's National Oracy Project, which recognizes the role played by classroom talk and puts equal treatment between spoken and written modes.

References

Oracy Matters: The Development of Talking and Listening in Education by Maggie MacLure (Editor), Terry Phillips (Editor), Andrew Wilkinson (Editor) (Open University Press, 1 Jun 1988)

External links

Aspects of Communication and the Plowden Report
Article about oracy in the classroom

Education issues
Oral communication
Rhetoric